Shabab Yatta is a professional football club based in the town of Yatta, within the Hebron Governorate in the Palestinian West Bank. The club currently compete in the West Bank Premier League. The club plays out of Dora International Stadium.

History

Shabab Yatta were founded in 1982.

Notable players
  Thaer Jboor

References

Association football clubs established in 1982
1982 establishments in the Palestinian territories
Football clubs in the West Bank